New Salem Township is located in Pike County, Illinois. As of the 2010 census, its population was 573 and it contained 276 housing units.

Geography

Demographics

See also 
New Salem, Pike County, Illinois

References

External links
City-data.com
Illinois State Archives

Townships in Pike County, Illinois
Townships in Illinois